The New Burnett Heads Light, also known as South Head Light, is an active lighthouse standing on the south side of the Burnett River entrance, in Burnett Heads, Queensland, Australia. In 1971 it replaced the Old Burnett Heads Light, which was relocated inland.

History
The Old Burnett Heads Light stood on the south side of the Burnett River entrance between 1873 and 1971, when it was replaced with this tower. The new lighthouse was the fourth of a group of seven concrete towers erected by the Commonwealth between 1964 and 1979, by order of construction, Cape Capricorn Light, New Caloundra Light, Point Danger Light, itself, Fitzroy Island Light, Point Cartwright Light and Archer Point Light. The tower is made of concrete and covered with tiles, in the "swimming pool" style, much like Point Cartwright Light and Fitzroy Island Light. The concrete base of the old lighthouse is still present next to the new tower. The lighthouse also carries a Cospas-Sarsat receiver, one of a pair in Australia, the second being at Cave Point Light, Western Australia.

Light specifications
The light characteristic shown is four white flashes every twenty seconds Fl.(4)W. 20s,  only visible in the sector 120°-320°. 

Site operation and visiting
The site and the lighthouse are managed by the Australian Maritime Safety Authority. The site is open, but the tower is closed to the public.

See also

 List of lighthouses in Australia

Notes

References

External links

Picture of New Burnett Heads Light

Lighthouses completed in 1971
Lighthouses in Queensland
1971 establishments in Australia
Wide Bay–Burnett